The characteristic rotational temperature ( or ) is commonly used in statistical thermodynamics to simplify the expression of the rotational partition function and the rotational contribution to molecular thermodynamic properties. It has units of temperature and is defined as

At about this temperature the population of excited rotational levels becomes important. Some typical values are given in the table. In each case the value refers to the most common isotopic species.

References

See also
Rotational spectroscopy
Vibrational temperature
Vibrational spectroscopy
Infrared spectroscopy
Spectroscopy

Atomic physics
Molecular physics